Azuero Peninsula is a large peninsula in southern Panama. It is surrounded by the Pacific Ocean in the south; the Pacific and Gulf of Montijo to the west, and by the Gulf of Panama in the east. The peninsula is effectively divided into two regions; the Western Azuero and the Eastern Azuero, as no serviceable roads join the two peninsula regions past the Pan-American Highway.

The Eastern Azuero Peninsula is known for baseball and is also a center of activity during the annual carnaval (carnival), with Las Tablas being the hub.  Pedasi is a small fishing town with sport fishing.

The Western Azuero Peninsula is known for its cattle ranching, farming, fishing, sunsets and beaches.

Tourism has begun to increase in the area both for the aforementioned sport fishing, surfing and for the local charm of cities like Chitré, Las Tablas and Pedasi. Due to a rise in tourism, real estate development has begun. The area enjoys some of the best weather in Panama being in a region known as the "Arco Seco" (dry arc).

Geography
Azuero is divided into three provinces, Herrera, Los Santos (which are entirely on the peninsula), and Veraguas which extends into it on the west side of the peninsula.  Most of the people live on the east coastal region.  The southern tip is sparsely populated, and western area (the Veraguas area) is just now opening up to development.  The largest towns are Chitré, the capital of Herrera, and Las Tablas.  The main road to the eastern Azuero peninsula connects to the Pan-American Highway in Divisa and runs south along the eastern side of the peninsula. The road to the western Azuero connects to the Pan-American just east of Santiago.

Punta Mariato on the western tip of the peninsula is the southernmost point on the mainland of Central America.

History
The Azuero region was one of the first parts of Panama to be settled more than 10,000 years ago, and the area in the north of the peninsula was cultivated thousands of years before the arrival of the Spaniards.

Environment
Its long history of cultivation and grazing has had a negative impact on the environment, resulting in what is sometimes called the Sarigua desert in the northeastern area of the peninsula, even though it is not technically a desert.  Along the coast there are areas of mangroves and just inland is a dry coastal forest called Albina. The Azuero is one of the most heavily deforested parts of Panamá, although sustainable land management systems such as silvopastoral grazing are emerging.

In the extreme south, Cerro Hoya is a national park and home of most of the remaining jungle habitat in the Azuero region.  Isla Canas, a coastal island connected via a sandbar to the peninsula, is used by a large number of sea turtles to lay their eggs each year.

References

External links 
 "Azuero Peninsula" Encyclopædia Britannica
 Best Places in the World to Retire: Azuero / Pedasi
 PanamaInfo: the Azuero Peninsula
 Alfalfa Travel Guide: the Azuero Peninsula
 Grandiablos, diablicos and other Azuero traditions
The Art of Precolumbian Gold: The Jan Mitchell Collection, an exhibition catalog from The Metropolitan Museum of Art (fully available online as PDF), which contains material on Azuero Peninsula
 

Peninsulas of Panama
Gulf of Panama
Panamanian coasts of the Pacific Ocean
Herrera Province
Los Santos Province
Veraguas Province